Oum El Adhaïm is a district in Souk Ahras Province, Algeria. It was named after its capital, Oum El Adhaïm.

Municipalities
The district is further divided into 3 municipalities:
Oum El Adhaïm
Tarraguelt
Oued Kebrit 

Districts of Souk Ahras Province